Ultrasound-guided peripheral nerve block is a procedure used in anesthesia that allows real-time imaging of the positions of the targeted nerve, needle, and surrounding vasculature and other anatomic structures. This visual aid increases the success rate of the block and may reduce the risk of complications. It may also reduce the amount of local anesthetic required, while reducing the onset time of blocks. Ultrasound has also resulted in an exponential rise in fascial plane blocks

References 

Regional anesthesia